Frier is a surname of Germanic origin. The name refers to:
Annette Frier (born 1974), German actress and comedian
Helga Frier (1893–1972), Danish actress
Lena Frier Kristiansen (born 1983), Danish badminton player
Mike Frier (born 1969), American football player
Pierre André Frier (1836- 1869), French military
Julien Frier (born 1974), French rugby player
T. J. Frier (born 1977), American football player

See also
Freier
Fryar
Fryer
Friar
Freer (disambiguation)